TPT may refer to:

 TPT (software), Time Partition Testing
 Transaction privilege tax, in Arizona, US
 Twin Cities Public Television, Minneapolis–St. Paul, Minnesota, US
 Tara Palmer-Tomkinson (1971–2017), English television personality
 Tramway de Pithiviers à Toury, a French railway
 Totul pentru tara, a Romanian fascist party 1935-1940
 Two-part tariff for a product
 The Powder Toy, falling sand game
 The Passion Translation, Christian Bible Translation